Valley Land is an album led by pianist Walter Bishop Jr. which was recorded in 1974 and released on the Muse label.

Reception 

Ron Wynn of AllMusic stated "Bishop demonstrates his proficiency with rapid-fire bop tunes and standards, playing superbly throughout this trio date".

Track listing 
All compositions by Walter Bishop Jr. except where noted.
 "Invitation" (Bronisław Kaper, Paul Francis Webster) — 8:34
 "Lush Life" (Billy Strayhorn) — 3:48
 "Sam's Blues" — 5:40	
 "You Stepped Out of a Dream" (Nacio Herb Brown, Gus Kahn) — 4:12
 "Valley Land" — 5:40	
 "Killer Joe" (Benny Golson) — 4:51 	
 "Make Someone Happy" (Jule Styne, Betty Comden, Adolph Green) — 4:27

Personnel 
Walter Bishop Jr. — piano
Sam Jones — bass
Billy Hart — drums

References 

Walter Bishop Jr. albums
1976 albums
Muse Records albums